Dahr Jamail (born 1968) is an American journalist who was one of the few unembedded journalists to report extensively from Iraq during the 2003 invasion of Iraq. He spent eight months in Iraq, between 2003 and 2005, and presented his stories on his website, entitled "Dahr Jamail's MidEast Dispatches." Jamail has been a reporter for Truthout and has also written for Al Jazeera. He has been a frequent guest on Democracy Now!, and is the recipient of the 2008 Martha Gellhorn Prize for Journalism. In 2018, the Izzy Award of the Park Center for Independent Media was awarded to Jamail, and shared by investigative reporters  Lee Fang, Sharon Lerner, and author Todd Miller.

Biography 
Jamail is a fourth-generation Lebanese American, who was born and raised in Houston, Texas. He graduated from Texas A&M University and later moved to Alaska. In October 2007, his first book, Beyond the Green Zone, was published by Haymarket Books. Jamail embarked on a national speaking tour the same month that the book was released, first in New York City, where he and journalist Jeremy Scahill discussed the Afghan and Iraq wars. In 2007, he was awarded the Joe A. Callaway Award for Civic Courage.

Jamail's second book, The Will to Resist: Soldiers Who Refuse to Fight in Iraq and Afghanistan, was published in 2009.

His next book, The Mass Destruction of Iraq; The Disintegration of a Nation: Why It Is Happening, and Who Is Responsible, was co-authored in 2014 with William Rivers Pitt.

Dahr Jamail writes for Truthout about climate change issues.  In January 2019, he published the book, The End of Ice: Bearing Witness and Finding Meaning in the Path of Climate Disruption, about his mountaineering adventures where he witnessed glaciers melting, expressing despair at the future catastrophe of global warming.

Works

References

External links 

Official site

1968 births
American alternative journalists
American anti–Iraq War activists
American people of the Iraq War
American people of Lebanese descent
American war correspondents
Living people
People from Houston
Texas A&M University alumni
War correspondents of the Iraq War
Writers from Alaska
Writers from Texas
Journalists from Texas
Activists from Texas